Agyneta pseudofuscipalpis is a species of sheet weaver found in Nepal. It was described by Wunderlich in 1993.

References

pseudofuscipalpis
Arthropods of Nepal
Spiders of Asia
Spiders described in 1993